Gas City High School, also known as the East Ward School, is a historic school building located at Gas City, Grant County, Indiana.  It was built in 1894, and is a two-story, square, Romanesque Revival style brick and stone building. A two-story Prairie School inspired addition was completed in 1923.  The two buildings are connected by a two-story "bridge".

It is no longer used as a high school and is instead now used as the current administration building for Mississinewa Community School Corporation (MCSC). 

It was listed on the National Register of Historic Places in 2004.

References

High schools in Indiana
School buildings on the National Register of Historic Places in Indiana
Romanesque Revival architecture in Indiana
School buildings completed in 1894
Schools in Grant County, Indiana
National Register of Historic Places in Grant County, Indiana
1894 establishments in Indiana